Ellas aman, ellos mienten is a Venezuelan telenovela written by José Vicente Quintana, produced by RCTV Producciones and distributed by RCTV International. It stars Patricia Amenta, and Héctor Peña. The telenovela was presented last year at NATPE.

Principal photography began on 9 May 2017. Televen began airing Ellas aman, ellos mienten from September 19, 2018.

Plot 
The story unfolds under the hot sun and passion of the Caribbean Sea. Ana Isabel learned to doubt men, in a house of single women, because her mother and grandmother were abandoned by deceitful men. She is also the victim of a great lie and faces the same disappointment as her predecessors. Salvador, her love, is the cause of her sister's death. However, Julián, a fun and romantic biker, will make him see that not all men are liars.

Cast 
 Patricia Amenta as Ana Isabel Díaz
 Héctor Peña as Salvador Quiñones Casal
 Flavia Gleske as María Teresa Díaz
 Erick Ronso as Julián Contreras
 Julie Restifo as Rosa Antonia Díaz

 Raquel Yánez as Marielena Castillo
 Hecham Alhad as Marco Antonio Rivero
 Sócrates Serrano as Carlos Eduardo Quiñones
 César Bencid as Ramón Chuecos
 Jeanette Flores as Berenice Casal
 Rhandy Piñango as Héctor
 Silvana Continanza as Alicia Álvarez
 Augusto Nitti as Reinaldo Arévalo
 Nany Tóvar as Yusleidi
 Héctor Almenara as Pedro Pablo Pantoja
 Alexandra Lemoine as Milagros Rojas
 Relu Cardozo as Dolores Rivero
 América Medina as Graciela Mendoza
 Arnaldo Aponte as Brayan Parada
 Kenia Karpio as Tania Suárez
 Diana Díaz as Irene Moreno
 Carlos Enrique Pérez as Miguel Rodríguez
 Zuly Méndez as Federica
 María Cristina Lozada as Juana Díaz
 Alexandra Braun as Rebeca Miranda

References

External links 
 

Venezuelan telenovelas
Spanish-language telenovelas
2018 telenovelas
RCTV telenovelas
2018 Venezuelan television series debuts
2018 Venezuelan television series endings
Television shows set in Venezuela